Mekeo is a language spoken in Papua New Guinea and had 19,000 speakers in 2003. It is an Oceanic language of the Papuan Tip Linkage. The two major villages that the language is spoken in are located in the Central Province of Papua New Guinea. These are named Ongofoina and Inauaisa. The language is also broken up into four dialects: East Mekeo; North West Mekeo; West Mekeo and North Mekeo. The standard dialect is East Mekeo. This main dialect is addressed throughout the article. In addition, there are at least two Mekeo-based pidgins.

Phonology
Mekeo employs a relatively simple system of phonology which consists of ten consonants and five vowels. The following tables identify both the consonants and vowels present in Mekeo.

Consonants

Note that the table above displays the range of consonants used in East Mekeo which is classified as the standard dialect. North West Mekeo, West Mekeo and North Mekeo each have slightly different consonants included in their dialects.

Vowels
Mekeo has five vowels, shown on the table below:

Morphology

Pronouns and person markers
In Mekeo, personal pronouns primarily refer to humans; however, the third-person forms can also be used for animals and other objects as well. Mekeo uses a range of different pronouns for different situations. The following table shows all the main personal pronouns for East Mekeo. This includes unmarked, emphatic and reflexive personal pronouns. Note that the emphatic pronouns are not common in East Mekeo as they compete with another more common topicaliser, . For example, the preferred form for the first person singular would be .
In the following table, 1, 2 and 3 indicate the person, SG and PL indicate whether the example is singular or plural and I and E stand for inclusive and exclusive.

Examples

The following examples demonstrate the use of some of the above personal pronouns in context.

Grammar

Possessive constructions

Possession in Mekeo has two morpho-syntactic distinctions: direct or indirect constructions. Direct possession concerns kinship relations and 'part of a whole relations' and these kind of relations are cultural in origin. Indirect possession covers a more general possession of alienable property.

Direct possession

Direct possession relies on relational terms that often form closed subsystems such as kinship terms. In Mekeo, the two relation terms involved in each equation are joined by another term that operates like a transitive verb. The third term is the 'relator' and must be marked for agreement with one of the other terms in the equation. The relator follows the subject and/or the object. The relator is marked for the person and number of the second term or the object.

Indirect possession

Expressing alienable possession in Mekeo requires the prefix E- and its various realisations (including zero). This morpheme is then optionally preceded by a free or bound pronoun and then the compulsory suffixed by a pronominal suffix which indicates the person and number of the possessor.

The negative is expressed with negators ,  and :

The following is an example of an alternation of the cliticisation process:

This pronoun expresses location or place:

Negation

Mekeo expresses negation in three ways:

 through the negative particle , which negates nominal predicates; 
 through existential negators, which differ between dialects; and 
 through a negative verb prefix, which negates verbal predicates.

This three-way functional distinction between different types of negation is typical of Oceanic languages.

Nominal Negation

Nominal predicates (which consist of one or more nominals) are negated in two ways — through either the negative particle or proclitic , or through existential negator particles.

The negative particle  is found in all dialects of Mekeo, with  pronounced as either a weak glottal stop or slight pause most dialects, or even not at all in East Mekeo.  negates a nominal predicate as seen in examples 10 and 11:

 also occurs as a proclitic particle before nominals, as seen in examples 12 and 13. In this case is functions similar to the English prefixes 'non-' or 'un-'.

The existential negators are sentence-final predicates — where a verb would otherwise be — and express denial of the existence, presence or identity of the preceding nominal predicate. Examples 14 to 17 show the existential negator of each dialect.

In both West Mekeo and Northern Mekeo,  can be analyzed as a compound of   'not' and  'mere'.

Verbal negation

Verbal predicates (which consist of a verb word and its arguments) in Mekeo are negated by a negator prefix attached to the predicate's verb word. Within the verb word, the negator prefix is found between tense-aspect-mood prefixes and the subject marker, with an intrusive consonant before the subject marker in some dialects. This negator prefix negates the entire verbal predicate. The position of the negator prefix between the tense-aspect-mood prefixes and the verb base is generally common in Oceanic languages.

Example 18 shows the position of the negator prefix in the North Mekeo expression  'Don't spill it!':

Examples 19 to 22 show the negator prefix in all four Mekeo dialects.

In North-West Mekeo, the existential negator  (see example 14) also occurs before some verbs to negate them in either the past tense or in the prohibitive mood. This occurs in addition , creating a double negative, as seen in example 23. Jones suggests that this may be to reduce ambiguity where the prefix  has otherwise assimilated with the verb stem; other dialects have an intrusive consonant between the negator prefix and verb stem, as shown in example 24 from West Mekeo.

Demonstratives and spatial deictics

List of abbreviations used for examples in this section

Demonstrative sentence structure 
According to World Atlas of Language Structures (WALS) writer Matthew S. Dryer, Mekeo is a mixed language type, meaning it does not follow a demonstrative-noun, or noun-demonstrative sentence structure, but has both.

Mekeo is spoken in the central province of Papua New Guinea. Kaki Ae is a neighbouring language of Mekeo. It is spoken to the north-east of where Mekeo is spoken. Kaki Ae has a demonstrative-noun sentence structure. Clifton describes Kaki Ae's noun phrase structure as Demonstrative-Place-Noun-Adjective-Numeral-Limiter, where the demonstrative precedes the noun, which is in accordance with the data on WALS.

According to Maino, Aufo and Bullock, Mekeo follows the following noun phrase structure: Demonstrative-Possessive/Noun/Adjective-Numeral/Quantifier.

Proximal demonstratives in the four dialects of Mekeo 
According to Jones, in Mekeo, there are three "degrees of proximity… represented in three of the four dialects". These four dialects are NWMek (North West Mekeo), WMek (West Mekeo), NMek (North Mekeo) and EMek (East Mekeo).

"These can refer to singular or plural, near or far", and is represented in the Tentative Grammar Description with the following table.

These can be represented through the following examples, provided by Jones.

 NWMek

 WMek

 WMek

 EMek

this       dog-3SG.ASS

'This (is a) dog.'

This noun phrase can be expanded by adding a suffix that marks the person and number of the deictic pronoun.

There can also be a second modifier, attached before the adjective:

The demonstrative 'that' ( is evident here, along with the third-person singular noun dog and adjective.

Deictic particles 
There also exists deictic particles (DX) in Mekeo, illustrated in the West Mekeo example below:

Anaphoric and exophoric use of demonstratives 
Mekeo uses both anaphoric and exophoric use of demonstratives, and clear anaphors are rare in Mekeo. Anaphoric strategies are not always effective in their identification according to Jones. Jones utilises the phrase "deictic reinforcement" for Mekeos use of personal pronouns or demonstrative pronouns to refer back to what has just been mentioned. Demonstrative pronouns are used for four reasons: to announce a new topic, to return to a previously mentioned topic, to announce a new topic specifically so as to not confuse with already established topics, and to "emphasise the presumed accessibility of a referent to the hearer".

An example of anaphoric demonstrative is shown in East Mekeo:
According to Jones, the comma represents the "actual or potential pause" within the sentence.

Exophoric use of demonstratives 
An example of exophoric use of demonstratives is highlighted by Jones:  
According to Jones, this sentence "translates to 'As for the bird, its wing!', that is as for the bird, it is its wing that is here important/salient/relevant".

Jones points out that there is an "implicit deictic argument it/that". For exophoric topics, when kin terms are used the topic is always a personal pronoun.

The personal pronoun  is used.

Deictic predicates 
Deictic predicates occur when the reference is not given. For example, the following response would be given to the question "Which dog do you mean?" 
The demonstrative  is used in the example above.

There is variation among the four dialects: 

The placement of commas in important in the Mekeo language. Jones highlights that if a comma had been placed after Papie   aŋa’o, then the translation would shift to "a woman who was carrying a basket".

Trade language

Jones (1996) reports two forms of pidgin Mekeo used for trade: the Imunga Trade Language and the Ioi Trade Jargon.

Notes

External links
 OLAC has a list of resources in and about the Mekeo language
 Paradisec has a number of collections that include Mekeo language materials

References

Further reading 
 

Languages of Papua New Guinea
Central Papuan Tip languages